Maitland, Tasmania is a rural locality, former town and a parish of Somerset Land District Tasmania. It is located on the Isis River.

References

Populated places established in the 19th century
Towns in Tasmania
Midlands (Tasmania)